Eugene Davidovich Sverdlov (born November 16, 1938 in Dnepropetrovsk) is a Russian biochemist, Doctor of Sciences, Academician of the Russian Academy of Sciences (since 1997), Academician of the Russian Academy of Agricultural Sciences (since 1991), Distinguished Professor at the Lomonosov Moscow State University (since 1999).
Director of the Institute of Molecular Genetics of the Russian Academy of Sciences (1988–2006).
Laureate of the 1981 USSR State Prize, 1984 Lenin Prize and of the 2015 State Prize of the Russian Federation.

E.D. Sverdlov is Head of Laboratory at the Shemyakin-Ovchinnikov Institute of Bioorganic Chemistry, RAS, since 1965.

From 1996 to 1998 he taught at the Boston University (USA).

He graduated from the MSU Faculty of Chemistry.
In 1965, he defended his Candidate's Dissertation.

He was elected a member of the German Academy of Sciences Leopoldina in 2001.

He was elected a member of the Academia Europaea in 2001.

He was elected a corresponding member of the Academy of Sciences of the USSR in 1984.

In 1988, he was awarded the Order of the Red Banner of Labour.

References

External links

1938 births
Living people
Russian biochemists
Soviet biochemists
Russian professors
Full Members of the Russian Academy of Sciences
Academicians of the Russian Academy of Agriculture Sciences
Members of the German Academy of Sciences Leopoldina
Members of Academia Europaea
Recipients of the USSR State Prize
Lenin Prize winners
State Prize of the Russian Federation laureates